Reza Fandi (born October 15, 1987 in Sigli) is an Indonesian footballer who currently plays for Aceh United. Previously, he played for PSAP Sigli in the Indonesia Super League and for PS Pidie Jaya.

Club statistics

References

External links

1987 births
Association football midfielders
Living people
Acehnese people
Indonesian footballers
Sportspeople from Aceh
Liga 1 (Indonesia) players
PSAP Sigli players
Indonesian Premier Division players
People from Pidie Regency